Cystiphora is a genus of gall midges in the family Cecidomyiidae. There are about seven described species in Cystiphora.

Species
These seven species belong to the genus Cystiphora:
 Cystiphora canadensis Felt, 1913 i c g
 Cystiphora leontodontis (Bremi, 1847) c g
 Cystiphora sanguinea (Bremi, 1847) c g
 Cystiphora schmidti (Rübsaamen, 1914) i c g b (rush skeletonweed gall midge)
 Cystiphora scorzonerae Kieffer, 1909 c g
 Cystiphora sonchi (Bremi, 1847) i c g b
 Cystiphora taraxaci (Kieffer, 1888) c g
Data sources: i = ITIS, c = Catalogue of Life, g = GBIF, b = Bugguide.net

References

Further reading

 
 
 
 
 

Cecidomyiinae
Articles created by Qbugbot
Cecidomyiidae genera